LocoRoco Cocoreccho (or  in Japan) is a platform game developed and published by Sony Computer Entertainment. The game released for PlayStation 3 via the PlayStation Network in September 2007. Described as an "interactive screensaver", LocoRoco Cocoreccho! features an autonomous two-dimensional environment in which the world and characters play even without input from the player.

Gameplay

In the game, players control a butterfly (the "Cocoreccho" of the title) to gather LocoRoco that are dispersed throughout a level and direct them to a goal in a large enough group to pass through. The player can call LocoRoco to the character, which is depicted as a ring of light emanating from the Cocoreccho, which prompts LocoRoco to move toward the Cocoreccho. Players can also use the Cocoreccho to tilt and jolt various characters and objects within the environment by positioning the Cocoreccho on the intended target and tilting or shaking the controller. Along the route there are three types of minigames. In each mini game it is possible to increase the number of LocoRoco by up to 15 by achieving a high score.

Reception 
LocoRoco Cocoreccho received "mixed or average" reviews, according to review aggregator Metacritic.

References

External links
 Official website

2007 video games
Platform games
PlayStation Network games
PlayStation 3 games
PlayStation 3-only games
Sony Interactive Entertainment games
Video games developed in Japan
Single-player video games